Lucky Kabootar is a 2014 Indian Hindi-language romantic-comedy film, directed by Shammi Chhabra and produced by Karan Raj Kanwar.

Lucky (Eijaz Khan) loves 'modern' Kammo (Shradha Das) but ends up marrying the girl-next-door Lakshmi (Kulraj Randhawa). An accident leads him to believe that his wife is dead.

Cast 
Eijaz Khan as Lucky
Ravi Kishan as Sunny
Shraddha Das as Kammo 
Sanjay Mishra as Sexidas Babaji
Kulraj Randhawa as Laxmi

Soundtrack

References

External links 
 
 

2014 films
2010s Hindi-language films
Indian romantic comedy films
2014 romantic comedy films